The 126th Separate Guards Gorlovskaya Twice Red Banner, Order of the Suvorov Coastal Defense Brigade (126 guards. parbo) is a formation of the Coastal Defence Troops of Russian Navy. It has the Military Unit Number 12676. It was only very recently granted the "Guards" honorific after suffering heavy losses while unsuccessfully attempting to capture Voznesensk in southern Ukraine during the 2022 Russian invasion of Ukraine.

The brigade is part of the 22nd Army Corps, Coastal Forces of the Russian Black Sea Fleet. Its garrison is located at Perevalne, in the Simferopol region of the Russian-occupied Republic of Crimea.

History 
The brigade inherited the awards, military glory and titles of the 126th Rifle Division (2nd formation) that took part in the Great Patriotic War. The division began to form on September 1, 1941, at Muchnaya station, Primorsky Krai (probably) as the Voroshilov Rifle Division of the 25th Army of the Far Eastern Front. Probably in January 1942 it was renamed the 126th Rifle Division (2nd Formation). Since February 1942, it has been part of the 39th Rifle Corps of the same army. On July 11, 1942, the division was transferred to the west. The division was part of the "operational army" (at the fighting front) from July 28, 1942 - May 19, 1944, and from July 8, 1944 - May 9, 1945. It took part in the Battle of Stalingrad and fought at Melitopol, and in Ukraine and in the seizure of the Crimean peninsula in 1944. In Crimea it fought as part of the 54th Rifle Corps, 2nd Guards Army, 4th Ukrainian Front. It was part of the 43rd Army of the 2nd Belorussian Front in May 1945.

It became a motor-rifle division in 1957. In March 1967, because of the departure of the headquarters of the 45th Army Corps, the 126th Motorized Rifle Division (military unit 19756) was transferred to the 32nd Army Corps of the Odessa Military District. It comprised the 257th Tank Regiment (Perevalne), which became 126th Tank Battalion around 1990, the 361st Motor Rifle Regiment (Yevpatoria), the 98th and 100th Motor Rifle Regiments (both Simferopol), the 816th Artillery Regiment, and 1096th Anti-Aircraft Rocket Regiment (Межгорье)).

"The division was maintained as a Not Ready Division - Low-Strength Cadre." (Holm)

On December 1, 1989, the division was transferred to the Red Banner Black Sea Fleet and transformed into the 283rd Gorlovka Twice Red Banner Order of Suvorov Coastal Defense Division. The transfer to the Navy was accompanied by an increase in the armament of the division. On January 3, 1990, the division's number 126 was restored. In 1996, the division was disbanded.

In 2003, on the basis of units of the 32nd Army Corps, the 36th Separate Coastal Defense Brigade of the Ukrainian Navy, military unit A2320, was formed. After a three-week blockade of the garrison by masked Russian special forces soldiers during the Annexation of Crimea by the Russian Federation, on March 21, 2014, servicemen loyal to the oath of Ukraine departed for the territory of the mainland. According to Colonel S. I. Storozhenko, the brigade commander, out of 1200 servicemen, 199 left, 300 quit, the rest swore allegiance to the Russian Federation. Thereafter it was reported that the brigade together with her commander entered the Armed Forces of the Russian Federation as a separate coastal defense brigade of the Black Sea Fleet. On December 1, 2014, the 126th Separate Coastal Defence Brigade was formed on the basis of this formation.

On March 2, 2022, units of the brigade crossed the Southern Bug River as part of the Southern Ukraine offensive of the 2022 Russian invasion of Ukraine. In their approach to Voznesensk, they encountered strong resistance. The Ukrainian 80th Air Assault Brigade said they were able to put down fire on two enemy artillery battalions, including howitzer artillery and rocket artillery of the 126th Brigade, which opened fire in the city of Voznesensk, Mykolaiv region. Ukrainian paratroops seized captured equipment, destroyed a vehicle with ammunition, a command vehicle, two Grad MLRS units and about 30 Russian soldiers.

On March 28, 2022, over three weeks after the brigade had been defeated at Voznesensk, it was announced that it would be granted a "Guards" title, without a change in its numerical designation. The 126th Brigade received the "Guards" title for mass heroism and courage during combat operations.

After the beginning of the successful Ukrainian Kherson offensive in September 2022, Telegram reports appeared saying that the brigade had suffered very heavy losses. Specifically, on October 5, 2022, messages appeared saying that "126 is no more.. the remnants of the brigade are attached to our [76 GAAD] operational subordination."

On October 15, 2022, the Institute for the Study of War wrote in their "Russian Offensive Campaign Assessment":
"A video posted to social media on October 13 shows servicemen of the 126th Coastal Defence Brigade of the Black Sea Fleet in an unspecified location in Kherson Oblast complaining that they have been fighting in the area since the beginning of the war without breaks or troop rotation. The servicemen asserted that they are being “crushed” by Ukrainian forces and emphasized that they have one BTR (armored personnel carrier) for 80 people, which is greatly restricting their maneuverability. After the video circulated, a Wagner Group-affiliated Telegram channel announced on October 14 that Wagner Group leadership decided to transfer four off-road vehicles to the 126th Coastal Defence Battalion [sic: Brigade] in support of their efforts to hold the frontline in Kherson Oblast.

References 

 

Brigades of Russia
Military units and formations established in 2014